Contract management software is the range of computer programmes, libraries and data used to support contract management, contract lifecycle management, and contractor management on projects. It may be used with project management software.

Advantages and key functions
Most sophisticated projects involving contractors now use contract management software instead of relying on the manual management of paper contracts. It has become an essential tool for keeping track of multiple activities with cost implications and can be especially helpful for automating administration, ensuring compliance, monitoring risk, running reports and triggering alerts. In addition to these types of features, contract management software systems provide a centralized repository for employees to quickly access all contracts worldwide in one place. Having contracts stored in multiple locations can delay and interrupt the contracting process.

Contract management software is produced by many companies, working on a range of scales and offering varying degrees of customizability. Basic functions should include the ability to store contract documents, track changes to contract documents, search documents for a particular criterion, send key date alerts and to report required aspects of the contract. Other functions include managing a new contract request, capturing related data, following a document through a review and approval process, and collecting digital signatures.  

Contract management software may also be an aid to project portfolio management and spend analysis, and may also monitor KPIs.  Leading contract management software provides contract visibility, monitoring, and compliance to automate and streamline the contract lifecycle process.

A centralized repository provides a critical advantage allowing for all contract documents to be stored within one location. Having contracts stored in multiple locations can delay and interrupt the contracting process.

Contract risk management software (CRMS) for capital projects
Very large enterprises, such as capital expenditure (capex) projects, involve multiple parties and high risk and uncertainty. They are unlike traditional operating contracts in that they are subject to shared deadlines in unique situations. As the complexity of these unique projects increases, the relationships between parties become more important. This requires contract management software, or contract risk management software (CRMS), to become more dynamic and responsive.

The terms of these capex contracts necessarily involve assumptions at the start of the process and are likely to change over the lifetime of the project lifecycle. For this reason, CRMS must be capable of recording one single instance of agreed changes to contract terms and incorporating these changes in an auditable and legally robust way. With multiple decision makers involved, CRMS should also make accountability more transparent and enable faster decisions about variation proposals.

Contract Management as part of EU GDPR compliance
The GDPR requires additional effort in regards to contract management. Each data responsible entity is obliged to sign data processing agreements (DPA) with the various vendors, who treat personal data on behalf of the data responsible.
DPAs need to be regularly controlled, adjusted and renewed, which adds an extra agreement to such vendors or at least an extra DPA addendum to each agreement.

References

Application software
Business software
Project management software